"Dancing Girls" is a song by the English singer-songwriter Nik Kershaw. It was the third single from his debut studio album, Human Racing, and released on 2 April 1984. It charted on 14 April 1984, and reaching a peak position of No. 13 in the UK Singles Chart. It stayed on the charts for nine weeks.

Music & Lyrics
Kershaw explained the song to Number One magazine in September 1984:

In a podcast interview with Sodajerker, Kershaw remembers writing the bassline spontaneously on a Roland Juno-6 synthesizer, using the arpeggiator function, and programming a rhythm on a Roland TR-808 drum machine – it was to this musical basis that the lyrics would be written.

Music video
The external street scenes for the music video for "Dancing Girls" were filmed in the dead-end section of Woodberry Grove, Finchley, North London. It depicted Kershaw as the subject of the song's lyrics, an advertising executive, imagining himself dancing with a group of middle aged dancers, including a six foot tall traffic warden, deliberately juxtaposed against Kershaw's 5'3" (160 cm) frame. The video was intended to be light-hearted, following on from the much darker video for Kershaw's previous single, "Wouldn't It Be Good".

Track listing
7" Single (MCA NIK 3)
A "Dancing Girls" (Remixed Version) – 3:36	
B "She Cries" – 3:45

12" Single (MCA NIKT 3)
There were four different UK 12" releases for "Dancing Girls", all sharing the same catalogue number

Charts

Reviews
Reviewer Paul Sinclair of website "Super Deluxe Edition" said of the song:

Meanwhile, Lisa Kalloo of Somojo2 said:

However, she was critical of the extended mix:

References

External links

1984 singles
Nik Kershaw songs
1984 songs
MCA Records singles
Songs written by Nik Kershaw
Song recordings produced by Peter Collins (record producer)